Cryptocarya onoprienkoana, commonly known as the rose maple, is a species of rainforest tree of northeastern Australia.

References

External links

Trees of Australia
Flora of Queensland
Laurales of Australia
onoprienkoana
Plants described in 1989
Taxa named by Bernard Hyland